Bradley Chedester Cabaness-Soileau (born March 27, 1986), known professionally as Bradley Soileau, is an American model, DJ, and designer known for appearing in Lana Del Rey's music videos "Blue Jeans" (2012), "Born to Die" (2012), and "West Coast" (2014).

Personal life
He is of French, German, and Spanish descent. He has mentioned having a stepmother and stepfather. He said his last name is pronounced like "swallow".

In April 2012, he married singer Porcelain Black. They divorced in 2014.

On August 18, 2021 Soileau was diagnosed with cirrhosis. 

In 2022, Soileau married musician Actually Huizenga.

Public image

Tattoos
Soileau is commonly noted for his tattoos. He has one on his forehead that reads "War inside my head" which is a reference Suicidal Tendencies' song "War Inside My Head". He has zombie praying hands from his temple to down below his ear.

Artistry

His clothing design has caught the attention of Vogue's Kelly Conner for its unique blend of styles.

Filmography

Music videos

References

External links 
 Official Website

Male models from Louisiana
Living people
1986 births
American atheists
American DJs
American people of French descent
American people of German descent
American people of Spanish descent